The League of Writers and Artists of Albania is a non-profit organization founded with the goal of promoting and advancing the literary and artistic creativity of Albanian writers and artists, as well as to assess and reassess the finest works of art in the following disciplines: music, painting, sculpture and literature. The organization actively promotes the originality and inventiveness of emerging young talents, while preserving Albanian traditional and modern values, in line with the best examples of literary and artistic values throughout the world.

Overview
The League of Writers and Artists of Albania is an organization of creators, based in Tirana, that gathers writers, composers, artists, creators of visual arts and critics alike. The association is a merger of two organizations, the League of Writers established on 7 October 1945 and the League of Artists, established in 1949. The First Congress held in 1957, unified these two organizations into a single institution that came to be known as the "League of Writers and Artists of Albania".

This voluntary association initially consisted of 74 members. Some of the most prominent intellectuals that participated in the early formation of the institution included Sejfulla Malëshova – its first chairman, Fan Noli – honorary president, Lasgush Poradeci, Nonda Bulka, Skënder Luarasi, Dhimitër Shuteriqi, Ali Asllani, Mitrush Kuteli, Vinçenc Prennushi, Sterjo Spasse, Et'hem Haxhiademi and others.

Activities

Communist period
The Albanian Encyclopedic Dictionary of 1985 describes the functions of the league as follows:

The highest structure of the league was the congress, which determined the direction of the literary-artistic creativity. The activity of the congress was guided by the Steering Committee, which in its meetings (plenums) dealt with issues of literary and artistic development. The working management was handled by the leadership of the committee. The league as a whole consisted of members and candidate members.

Several operating commissions were set up which covered: poetry, prose, dramaturgy, children's literature, literary criticism, music and visual arts. Local branches were established in all districts of the country, which aimed to unite creators from different fields.

The League had its own literary publications: Drita, Nëntori and a French-language magazine titled "Lettres albanaises".

Legacy
During the 1960s, the league accused writers it deemed guilty of neglecting their responsibility as communists to reflect socialist realism in their writings and thereby advance the goals of the Labour Party. Some were arrested and were either imprisoned or executed and others were hounded by the state secret police and suffered attacks.

Among the notable dissident authors were Kasëm Trebeshina (imprisoned), Pjetër Arbnori (convicted for his literary anti-communist work and imprisoned for 28 years), Bilal Xhaferri (expelled, exiled in communist gulags, and forced to flee to the United States) and Vilson Blloshmi (executed). Others survived, such as the poet Xhevahir Spahiu and the writer Ismail Kadare (who ultimately defected to France to escape the regime).

Bibliography 
 Academy of Sciences of Albania, Encyclopedic Dictionary, 2nd Edition, (2008), Tirana, 
 Robert Elsie, Albanian literature: a short history, I.B.Tauris, (2005), .

See also
Albanian literature
Albanian culture

References

1957 establishments in Albania
Albanian writers' organizations
Arts organizations established in 1957